Moon blocks or jiaobei (also written as jiao bei etc. variants), also poe (from ; as used in the term "poe divination"), are wooden divination tools originating from China, which are used in pairs and thrown to seek divine guidance in the form of a yes or no question. They are made out of wood or bamboo and carved into a crescent shape. A pair of clam shells can also be used. Each block is round on one side (known as the yin side) and flat on the other (known as the yang side). It is one of the more commonly used items found in Chinese traditional religion and are used in temples and home shrines along with fortune sticks, both of which are often used together when requesting an answer from the Deities.

Practice
Moon blocks can be used separately to receive a straightforward answer, or they are accompanied by fortune sticks to clarify an oracle. When used alone, moon blocks are first purified by revolving the blocks around the incense burner three times. The querent then kneels and says their name, date of birth, residence, and question while cupping the blocks between their hands in prayer. After the querent poses the question to the gods, the blocks are dropped to the floor and land in a specific position.

There are four possible answers that the moon blocks can produce:

 Shèngjiǎo (聖筊, divine answer): One block flat and another block round is a 'yes' answer.
 Nùjiǎo (怒筊, angry answer) also kūjiao (哭筊, crying answer) or méijiǎo (沒筊, no answer): Both blocks round is a 'no' answer. It is said that the gods are displeased or show disagreement with the question, and this is shown in the way the blocks directly fall flat on the floor.
 Xiàojiǎo (笑筊, laughing answer): Both blocks flat have several interpretations; in any case it is said the gods are laughing at the question depending on what has been asked. It can be interpreted as an emphasized 'no' answer, the question that was asked was unclear, or that the answer to the question is obvious. One characteristic of this answer is when the blocks sway back and forth when dropped, a symbolic show of laughter.
 Lìjiǎo (立筊, standing answer): One or both blocks falling but standing erect on the floor (so that the block is standing up on the two pointed ends) indicates that the deities do not understand the referent's question, therefore the question is nullified and the procedure must be repeated.

When used alone without the fortune sticks, the blocks are thrown three times in order to maintain accuracy of the deity's answer, a successful answer usually being three consecutive throws showing shèngjiǎo, or best two out of three throws.

Usages

Aside from questioning the deities on mundane affairs, moon blocks are also used to verify a range of issues, such as proper ritual protocol, spiritual presence of the gods or if they have eaten the offerings presented to them.

See also
 Feng shui
 Fuji (planchette writing)
 Kau cim
 Omikuji
 Oracle
 Poe divination
 Tangki
 Tung Shing

References

External links
 Divination blocks
 

Divination
Buddhism in Hong Kong
Chinese culture
Chinese inventions
Chinese words and phrases
Taoism in Hong Kong